Garrett James Bradley (born July 4, 1970) is an American lawyer and the former representative in the Massachusetts House of Representatives for the 3rd Plymouth district, which consists of the town of Cohasset, in the county of Norfolk; and the towns of Hingham (sans precinct 2) and Hull, and precinct 3 of the town of Scituate, all in the county of Plymouth.

Early life and career
Bradley attended Boston College High School, where he graduated from in 1988. He then attended Boston College, where he received a bachelor's degree in 1992. He also received a Juris Doctor degree from Boston College Law School in 1995. He has previously worked as an Assistant District Attorney in the Plymouth County District Attorney's office, and also works with the Thornton Law Firm law office.

Political career
Bradley served on the Hingham Capital Outlay Committee and was a member of the Hingham Democratic Town Committee before running for State Representative. Bradley first ran for the 3rd Plymouth district in 1998, but was defeated in the general election by Republican Mary Jeanette Murray.  Bradley ran again in 2000, and defeated Republican Mary Ann McKenna in the general election.  Bradley was reelected to the seat seven times.

Bradley served as Second Assistant Majority Leader, First Division Leader, House Chairman of the Joint Committee on Election Laws, and Vice-Chairman of the Committee on The Judiciary. He also served on the Joint Committee on Rules, the Special Joint Committee on Redistricting, and the House Committee on Rules.  He voted in favor of casino gambling in 2011.

Electoral history

References

External links
Massachusetts Legislature Member Profile
Campaign Website
Project Vote Smart Biography

Democratic Party members of the Massachusetts House of Representatives
Massachusetts lawyers
Boston College alumni
Boston College Law School alumni
1970 births
Living people
People from Woburn, Massachusetts
Boston College High School alumni
21st-century American politicians
20th-century American politicians
20th-century American lawyers
21st-century American lawyers
People from Hingham, Massachusetts